28 Acts in 28 Minutes is a stand-up TV comedy show aired on the UK's BBC Three in 2005. It comprises 28 acts, each given a minute to perform. Two episodes were aired.

A 3-part series also aired on BBC Radio 4 in June 2006, chaired by John Humphrys.

List of acts (BBC Three)

Show One

Show Two

List of acts (BBC Radio 4)

21 June 2006

28 June 2006

5 July 2006

25 August 2006 (Edinburgh Festival Special)

Series 2 schedule - List of acts (BBC Radio 4)

Episode 1: Thurs 20 December 2007, 6.30pm

Episode 2: Thurs 3 January 2008, 6.30pm

Episode 3: Thurs 27 March 2008, 6.30pm

References

External links 

/radio4

BBC television comedy